The Class 92 is a type of electric multiple unit operated by Keretapi Tanah Melayu on its KTM Komuter services. A total of 38 sets were built by CSR Zhuzhou of China, in 6-car formations.

History 
The Class 92 was procured under a Malaysian Government initiative,  National Key Result Area (NKRA) to reduce congestion and improve public transport with a specific RM2 billion allocation to KTMB to improve commuter rail efficiency. A sum of RM 1.894 billion was spent to procure these trains, with the remainder being spent on the improvement of signaling along the Putra-Mid Valley stretch and a ticketing system upgrade.

The first EMU was delivered on 23 September 2011 and was expected to operate in revenue service by late December 2011. However, delays in testing led to the subsequent postponement of launch. On 8 March 2012, 4 sets commenced operation. All 38 sets were in revenue service by July 2012.

Features 
Designed for low dwell times and high passenger seating capacity, the trains have three double leaf doors per side. The driving motors have longitudinal seating only while the trailer feature a mixture of longitudinal and traverse 2+2 seating. It has wide gang-ways interconnecting each coach, allowing passengers to distribute effectively throughout the length of the train. However, two middle coaches of the class 92 is designated women's only coaches by its operator KTM, limiting full interactivity within the train set. Dynamic route maps located above doors details trains position relative to station in real-time. CCTVs and 3-pin power outlets are provided as further features. All trains have over-head air-conditioning systems to provide ventilation, dehumidification and comfortable temperature control.

The KTM Class 92 trains are fitted with 65 million euros worth of Siemens made transformers, power converters, traction motors and vehicle control systems.

Operation
The Class 92 operates along the two Komuter lines in the Central Sector. During current 15-minute frequency operations, as many as 25 class 92 sets are used while the remaining sets are kept in reserve. In the future (10-minute frequency operations), it is expected for the total maximum of concurrently used sets to increase to 36 with 2 to remain in reserve.

Special service
During festivities, the KTM Class 92 is used for special services. Special services typically occur during occasions such as the "homecoming" exodus, saw class 92 sets operating intercity routes, such as the KL Sentral-Ipoh route complementing the ETS train service. In other festivities, such as the festival of Thaipusam, the class 92 also provides service from Ipoh direct to Batu Caves.

Maintenance and Depot
The Class 92 sets is maintained by its manufacturer CSR Zhuzhou. The maintenance facility will be based mainly at KTM’s Sentul Komuter Depot while a minor secondary base is located at Tanjung Malim. 

On top of all that, a new special  commuter maintenance depot is being built (completion by Sept 2013) in the vicinity of Seremban station to house the class 92. The depot will have a capacity of stabling 19 six coach Class 92 sets and be able to conduct simultaneous maintenance work on up to 6 sets of commuter trains. The depot will also have up to 15 tracks of  each to store and maintain trains. The depot will also stage other Rawang-Seremban line rolling stocks.

Design and Construction

The exterior and interior of the class 92 is fully designed in Germany by Tricon Design for CSR Zhuzhou. The exterior has a Malaysian tiger inspired front motif and tiger fur side coating. 

The trains were assembled in CSR Zhuzhou's Electric Plant train factory in China, while power traction units and vehicle control systems were built by Siemens in Germany.

Formation

Cars 2 and 5 are equipped with a double-arm Z-shaped pantograph.

Cars 3 and 4 are designated women's only car.

Corruption Investigation
The purchase of the KTM class 92 was notably under investigation by the Malaysian Anti Corruption Commission (MACC) over its tender process. In 2008, the Chinese railway manufacturer Zhuzhou Electric Locomotive Co Ltd, being the lowest bidder, was originally awarded the tender to build 3 car sets at the cost of RM 13.7 million. This figure later increased to RM 48 million per 6 car set. According to the details revealed to the press about the investigation, the re-negotiation process was held directly with the manufacturer and there was certain irregularities in pricing. The investigation is still on-going.

Operational Issues 
There has been a number of issues related to the Class 92. In a comment by KTMB's incumbent president, Elias Kadir has noted that the class 92 is "not up to standard". In other related incidents, in which Class 92 sets malfunctioned was due reportedly to poor maintenance and non-payment to suppliers.

Poor fleet management has led to many KTM Class 92 sets to have gone without routine maintenance, thus leading to a void in manufacturer warranty. According to the Auditor-General’s Report, The sum of RM99.94 million paid by the Railway Assets Corporation (RAC) to CSR Zhuzhou Electric Locomotive Co Limited to service the six-car Electric Multiple Unit (EMU) cannot be reimbursed due to KTMB's failure in its part of sending the trains for necessary maintenance.

Vandalism
Immediately, following its launch a number of KTM Class 92 were intentionally damaged, at least 20 side windows are cracked or holed, due a number of stone throwing incidents. This has culminated in a number of media reports. Despite the incidents, KTMB has no intention of upgrading the SCS to shatterproof glass to counter these incident. During the 2018 Malaysian general election, trains plastered with campaign advertising from then ruling party Barisan National had their windows cracked again.

Accidents and Incidents

 On 15 February 2013 at 23:00, an out-of-service KTM Class 92 SCS 20 derailed near Shah Alam station while returning to Sentul depot for maintenance. No one was injured. The train was heavily damaged and was subsequently written off.
 On 15 April 2018, at around 13:00, SCS23 had a minor derail near Kuala Lumpur station, heading to Port Klang. No one was injured.
 On 23 August 2018, at approximately 6.09 am, Set SCS06 rammed into the stoppers at Port Klang Station as the driver was believed to have not secured the brakes. The train was about to start its return journey to KL Sentral station. There were no injuries reported but it caused delays on the Port Klang Line.
 On 18 October 2018, at around 06:02, a Class 26 locomotive hauling 30 wagons had crashed onto Set SCS06 (the same trainset involved at Port Klang on August 23) when it was stationary at Tanjung Malim Station. 5 passengers were reported injured with the trainset heavily damaged.

Launch Delays
The premature decay in KTM class 8X circa 2006-2012, led to a public outcry for new commuter rolling stock. Hence, there was a need for a fast-tracked tender of new trains in order to meet the rising rail passenger demand.

Originally the first set was expected to be launched in December 2011, it was later delayed to January  and then February 2012. The eventual launch date for Class 92 took place on March 8, 2012. 

Reports place the delay as a result of further operational testing, and driver training.

Gallery

References

External links

KTM Komuter
Multiple units of Malaysia
CRRC multiple units
Train-related introductions in 2012
25 kV AC multiple units